Damian Seweryn (born September 30, 1979 in Poznań) is a Polish footballer (midfielder) playing currently for ŁKS Łódź.

Career

Club
In June 2010, he joined ŁKS Łódź on a two-year contract.

References

External links 
 

Living people
1979 births
Polish footballers
ŁKS Łódź players
Piast Gliwice players
Odra Wodzisław Śląski players
Górnik Zabrze players
Polonia Warsaw players
Widzew Łódź players
Warta Poznań players
Footballers from Poznań
Association football midfielders